"Start Over" is the fourth single by Japanese rock band Band-Maid, released in Japan on July 25, 2018, by Crown Stones.

Composition and lyrics
"Start Over" was written in a more pop oriented style, as opposed to their usual hard rock. Lead guitarist Kanami Tōno, plays the piano in the song. It was lead vocalist Saiki Atsumi's idea to include piano, as well as to not have a guitar solo. The lyrics were written to be easy to sing in karaoke, as many of their fans expressed difficulty in singing their songs. There were originally more English lyrics, but Atsumi told rhythm guitarist/vocalist Miku Kobato, to cut down on them. For the lyrics, Kobato had in mind a theme of contradictory love and that she didn't want to make the lyrics too dark or too cute. Kobato included the lyrics "I don't give a fuck" at the end of the song because she didn't want the song to end poppy.

For "Screaming", they wanted to make a song that was more like Band-Maid's previous songs. It was originally going to be included on their album Conqueror, but ultimately, a new song, "Dilemma", was chosen instead. The tempo is 215. It originally had a slower tempo. In 2019, as Band-Maiko, they released an alternate version with traditional Japanese instruments and lyrics rewritten in the Kyoto dialect.

Background and release
The single was released in three versions: a limited edition which contains the CD, a Blu-ray of a concert recorded at Zepp Tokyo on April 13, 2018, a postcard and an additional CD containing "Secret Maiko Lips", a second limited edition which contains the CD and a DVD of the aforementioned concert, and a standard edition which only contains the CD.

Critical reception
Marc Bowie of J-Generation said that the title track is "catchy as hell, the song blends jazzy piano, palm-muted guitar and sinuous bass work with a crunchy chorus." Trent Cannon of Rice Digital said that the title track "...is a great track that is a little bit slower, featuring a bit of piano to lighten the mood."

Music video
The music video for "Start Over" was released on July 3, 2018. French model Mitsugi appeared in the music video.

Live performances
Live versions of "Screaming" were later released on their video albums Band-Maid World Domination Tour [Shinka] at Line Cube Shibuya (Shibuya Public Hall) and Band-Maid Online Okyu-Ji (Feb. 11, 2021).

Track listing
CD

DVD/Blu-ray

Credits and personnel
Band-Maid members
 Misa – bass
 Miku Kobato – vocals, guitar
 Saiki Atsumi – vocals
 Akane Hirose – drums
 Kanami Tōno – guitar

Recording and management
 Recorded at Nasoundra Palace Studio
 Recording engineer: Masyoshi Yamamoto
 Mixed at Mix Forest
 Mix engineer: Masahiko Fukui
 Mastered by Masahiko Fukui
 Art Direction: Satoshi Kohno
 Photography: Kaori Uemura

Charts

Release history

References

External links 
 Discography – Band-Maid official website

2018 singles
Band-Maid songs
Japanese-language songs